Verkhnesorokino is a rural locality (a village) in Irsayevsky Selsoviet, Mishkinsky District, Bashkortostan, Russia. The population was 412 as of 2010. There are 4 streets.

Geography 
Verkhnesorokino is located 9 km northwest of Mishkino (the district's administrative centre) by road. Nizhnesorokino is the nearest rural locality.

References 

Rural localities in Mishkinsky District